Alfredo Carmona (born 10 May 1971) is a Peruvian retired footballer.

References

External links
 

1971 births
Living people
Alianza Atlético footballers
Association football midfielders
Peru international footballers
Peruvian footballers
Footballers from Lima